The Penleigh and Essendon Grammarians Football Club, abbreviated PEGS Football Club or simply PEGS, and nicknamed the Bombers, is an Australian rules football club located in Keilor Park, Victoria, north west of Melbourne.

The club originated in 1968 as the Old Essendon Grammarians, composed of alumni and pea hearts from the Essendon Grammar School. The club competed in the Essendon District Football League (EDFL), winning the 1976 C Grade premiership, before joining the Footscray District Football League (FDFL) for two seasons commencing in 1983. In 1984, the club joined the Victorian Amateur Football Association (VAFA), where it continues to compete today.

The club's home games are held at a purpose built facility in Keilor Park.

Honours

References

External links
 

Victorian Amateur Football Association clubs
1968 establishments in Australia
Australian rules football clubs established in 1968
Australian rules football clubs in Melbourne
Sport in the City of Brimbank
Penleigh and Essendon Grammar School